NASCO or Nasco may refer to:

 Nasco (grape), an Italian grape variety
 Claudio Nasco (1976–2013), Cuban journalist and newscaster
 Jan Nasco (c. 1510–1561), Franco-Flemish composer and writer on music
 Joe Nasco (born 1984), American soccer player
 National Association of State Charity Officials, an American association of regulators
 Native American Services Corp., a construction company in Kellogg, Idaho
 North American Students of Cooperation, a federation of housing cooperatives in Canada and the United States
 North American SuperCorridor Coalition, a non-profit transportation organization
 North Atlantic Salmon Conservation Organization, an international fishing regulator

See also
 NESCO (disambiguation)
 National Steel and Shipbuilding Company (NASSCO), a shipyard in San Diego, California